The Damage Manual was an industrial supergroup formed in 2000. It featured Martin Atkins on drums and loops, Chris Connelly on vocals, Geordie Walker on guitar and Jah Wobble on bass. A second lineup saw Steven Seibold of the band Hate Dept. replacing both Walker and Wobble after their departure.

History

Originally stemming from discussions between Atkins and Wobble, Walker was brought aboard when Wobble expressed interest in working with him. After writing and arranging material through exchanging recordings from their own respective studios, the trio had put together a batch of instrumental ideas in need of a vocalist. It has been said that they originally approached John Lydon (Public Image Ltd, Sex Pistols) for an amicable resurgence (both Atkins and Wobble did notable work in PiL) but he declined the opportunity. Atkins and Walker had both done solid work with the talented vocalist/songwriter Chris Connelly in the early 1990s with Murder, Inc. They released two recordings in 2000, the One EP in April followed by a self-titled album that September, both on Atkins' own Invisible Records label. The group dissolved after a US tour which did not include Jah Wobble who was reported as not being interested in touring with the band, although he had played on the UK leg of the tour. Invisible Records later released a collected reissue of the first EP and full length album titled Double Damage as well as a remix LP.

In 2004, a resurrected Damage Manual without Walker and Wobble found Steven Seibold of the band Hate Dept. providing guitar and bass. The revised band released the full length record Limited Edition. It was to be followed by a headlining tour in 2004; however, that was canceled due to a series of emergencies within Martin Atkins's family. A subsequent tour with Pigface and Sheep on Drugs in 2005 was also canceled, this time due to Chris Connelly's illness. A DVD compilation of studio recording footage, interviews and more, titled The Damage Manual was released in 2008.

Discography

Albums
 The Damage Manual (2000)
 Double Damage (2002) (Compilation of 'The Damage Manual' album and 'One' EP)
 Damaged: The Remixes (2003)
 Limited Edition (2005)
 Damaged Dubs (2006) (Remixes)

EPs
 One (2000)

DVDs
The Damage Manual (2008)

References

External links
 Damage Manual on Myspace

Killing Joke
Musical groups established in 2000
British industrial music groups
Rock music supergroups
Underground, Inc. artists